Les Deux-Jumeaux (formerly Hendaye-Plage) is a railway station in Hendaye, Nouvelle-Aquitaine, France. The station is located on the Bordeaux–Irun railway line. The station is served by TER (local) services operated by the SNCF.

Train services
The following services currently call at Les Deux-Jumeaux:
local service (TER Nouvelle-Aquitaine) Bordeaux - Dax - Bayonne - Hendaye

References

Railway stations in Pyrénées-Atlantiques
Railway stations in France opened in 1926